Adalgisel was a Frankish duke and the mayor of the palace of Austrasia.

Adalgisel is a Germanic masculine given name that may refer to:
Adalgisel Grimo (died after 634), Frankish deacon
Aldgisl, Frisian duke

See also
Adelchis (given name)

Masculine given names